Albert Barnes & Co were Rhyl based manufacturers of miniature steam locomotives. A number of them are preserved at the Rhyl Miniature Railway. Albert Barnes was the owner of  Rhyl Amusements Ltd. Six 4-4-2 locomotives were built.

Locomotive list

References

Barnes